Murdoch Mysteries is a Canadian mystery drama television series that began in 2008. The series is based on the Detective Murdoch novels by Maureen Jennings and is set in Toronto around the turn of the 20th century. It centres on William Murdoch (Yannick Bisson), a detective at Station House Four, who solves crimes using scientific techniques and inventions which are highly advanced for the time (e.g. fingerprinting). He is assisted by Constable George Crabtree (Jonny Harris), city coroner Doctor Julia Ogden (Hélène Joy) and Inspector Thomas Brackenreid (Thomas Craig). The show was developed for television by R.B. Carney, Cal Coons and Alexandra Zarowny. It is produced by Shaftesbury Films.

The series was preceded by three television movies, which aired on Bravo! from 2004 to 2005. These featured a different cast: Peter Outerbridge as Murdoch, Keeley Hawes as Doctor Ogden, Matthew MacFadzean as Constable Crabtree and Colm Meaney as Inspector Brackenreid.

Murdoch Mysteries aired on Citytv for five seasons before being cancelled. It was then picked up by CBC, where it has aired since season six. The show airs in the UK on Alibi and is co-produced by Alibi's parent company, UKTV. It has also aired in the United States on Ovation under the title The Artful Detective, but as of season twelve, has reverted to the original title.
The United States will premiere Season 14 on Ovation, starting February 20, 2021. Season 15 aired in the US on both Ovation and Acorn TV at the start of January 2022.

Series overview

Episodes

Television films (2004–2005)

Season 1 (2008) 

In July 2007, Shaftesbury Films announced that filming had begun on a 13-episode series based on both Maureen Jennings' novels and the Murdoch Mysteries TV movies, which would air on Bravo! in 2008. However, subsequent changes in Canadian media ownership resulted in Bravo! being owned by CTVglobemedia, whereas Murdoch Mysteries was acquired by Rogers Communications, who decided to air it on their recently acquired CityTV network.

Filming of the first season of Murdoch Mysteries took place between June 11 and October 17, 2007, primarily in Toronto and Hamilton, Ontario.

Recurring cast members include Tamara Hope as Edna Garrison, Dmitry Chepovetsky as Nikola Tesla, Lachlan Murdoch as Constable Henry Higgins, Arwen Humphreys as Margaret Brackenreid, Allan Royal as Chief Constable Stockton, Geraint Wyn Davies as Arthur Conan Doyle, Maria del Mar as Sarah Pensell, Stephen McHattie as Harry Murdoch, and Peter Keleghan as Terrence Meyers.

Season 2 (2009) 

Murdoch Mysteries was renewed for a second season by CityTV in April 2008.

Filming for season two took place in Toronto, Cambridge and St. George. Additional filming took place in Drumheller and near Vancouver, where the set of the 1989 series Bordertown was used.

Recurring cast members include Lachlan Murdoch as Henry Higgins, Arwen Humphreys as Margaret Brackenreid, Paul Amos as Doctor Roberts, Sarah Gadon as Ruby Ogden, Michael Seater as James Gillies, Peter Keleghan as Terrence Meyers, Sarah Allen as Enid Jones, Dakota Goyo as Alwyn Jones, and Stephen McHattie as Harry Murdoch.

Season 3 (2010) 

Murdoch Mysteries was renewed for a third season by CityTV in June 2009. As part of the show's production deal, all episodes premiered in the UK on the Alibi network before premiering in Canada; this arrangement continued until the end of season five.

The first episode of season three was partially filmed in Bristol, England. Additional filming took place around Ontario, at Ball's Falls and the Glanmore National Historic Site.

Recurring cast members include Lachlan Murdoch as Henry Higgins, Lisa Faulkner as Anna Fulford, Allan Royal as Chief Constable Stockton, Richard Clarkin as Inspector Davis, Arwen Humphreys as Margaret Brackenreid, Paul Amos as Doctor Roberts, Peter Stebbings as James Pendrick, Kate Greenhouse as Sally Pendrick, Sarah Gadon as Ruby Ogden, Dmitry Chepovetsky as Nikola Tesla, and Peter Keleghan as Terrence Meyers.

Season 4 (2011) 

In August 2010, Shaftesbury Films announced that production on season four had begun and was scheduled to continue through November 2010. Guest stars in season four include Victor Garber, Lisa Faulkner, Simon Williams, Peter Keleghan, Craig Olejnik, and Lisa Ray. On October 15, 2010, then Canadian Prime Minister Stephen Harper and his daughter visited the set of Murdoch Mysteries. As part of the visit to the set Stephen Harper filmed a cameo appearance.

Season 5 (2012) 

Season five was announced at the Citytv 'Summer in the Square' on May 31, 2011. Part of the festivities of the day included a Victorian era costume competition with the winner getting a role in an episode of Murdoch Mysteries.

Season 6 (2013) 

On November 15, 2011, it was announced that CBC would broadcast a sixth season of Murdoch Mysteries. 

Scenes from "The Ghost of Queen's Park" were filmed on location on July 13, 2012. David Onley, the current Lieutenant Governor of Ontario, had a cameo in season six in which he portrayed the eighth Lieutenant Governor of Ontario, Oliver Mowat. Thomas Howes made a guest appearance as Winston Churchill, who asked Murdoch's help when he was accused of murder.

Georgina Reilly (Dr. Emily Grace) was promoted to series regular for the sixth season.

Season 7 (2013–2014) 

On April 2, 2013, CBC renewed Murdoch Mysteries for a seventh season, to consist of an extended order of 18 episodes instead of the usual 13. The seventh season had its premiere on September 30, 2013.

Season 8 (2014–2015) 

On April 4, 2014, CBC renewed Murdoch Mysteries for an eighth season.

Season 9 (2015–2016) 

On March 4, 2015, it was announced that CBC had renewed Murdoch Mysteries for a ninth season. On May 25, 2015, it was announced that William Shatner would be guest starring as author Mark Twain. Season 9 will see guest appearances of Lucy Maud Montgomery, Prime Minister Wilfrid Laurier and Mouna Traoré as Rebecca James, a young protegee whom Julia takes under her wing.

Season 10 (2016–2017) 

On March 31, 2016, CBC announced the tenth season of Murdoch Mysteries, ten days after the ninth-season finale.

Season 11 (2017–2018) 

On March 13, 2017, CBC renewed the show for an eleventh season consisting of 18 episodes and a third two-hour Christmas special.

This season saw the return of Alexander Graham Bell and Theodore Roosevelt. Helen Keller, Anne Sullivan  and Dr. William Osler made guest appearances as well.  Dylan Neal reprised his role as  Jasper Linney, Murdoch's half brother, during the Christmas special, last seen in the season two finale.

Mouna Traoré, who played Rebecca James, left the show in episode two, with a guest appearance in episode seventeen. Shanice Banton joined the cast in episode four, in a recurring role, as Violet Hart, a medical student and Julia's new morgue assistant.

Season 12 (2018–2019) 

Unlike seasons nine through eleven, the twelfth season of Murdoch Mysteries did not include a Christmas movie, opting instead for an "out of the box" Halloween episode.   Former Canadian Olympic figure skater Elvis Stojko guest starred in episode 13 as ex-con Sam Marshal, who Murdoch suspects of murder.  The episode also saw the return of, Dmitry Chepovetsky as Nikola Tesla, whose last appearance was nine years ago in season 3, episode 13. Colin Mochrie reprises his role from last season as Ralph Fellows and Patrick McKenna returned as Inspector Hamish Slorach, last seen in season eight. The season averaged 1.1 million viewers in Canada on CBC from September 24, 2018, to March 4, 2019.

Season 13 (2019–2020) 

On March 25, 2019, CBC renewed the show for a thirteenth season of eighteen episodes. This season, Murdoch Mysteries celebrated its 200th episode, with Lisa Norton, John Tench, Dmitry Chepovetsky, David Storch and Peter Stebbings, reprising their roles as Emma Goldman, Alexander Graham Bell, Nicholas Telsa, Thomas Edison, and James Pendrick respectively.  Colm Feore made a guest appearance this season as George's long lost father, George Crabtree Sr., that was directed by Yannick Bisson.

Season 14 (2021) 

This season sees the return of Peter Keleghan, Peter Stebbings, and Matthew Bennett as Terrence Meyers, James Pendrick and Allen Clegg, respectively, with Yannick Bisson directing the first two episodes and a total of eleven episodes.

Season 15 (2021–2022) 

Season fifteen has twenty four episodes, including Halloween and Christmas specials, a first for the show. Once again, Yannick Bisson directed two episodes and Maureen Jennings wrote one. Returning recurring stars include Nigel Bennett as Chief Constable Giles, Jesse LaVercombe as Jack Walker, Colin Mochrie as Ralph Fellows, Peter Stebbings as James Pendrick and Peter Keleghan as Terrence Meyers, with Keleghan's wife, Leah Pinsent, guest starring, playing his TV wife.

Season 16 (2022–2023) 
On June 1, 2022, the sixteenth season was announced, for another twenty four episodes, including another Halloween episode. Season sixteen also marked the 250th episode, which was filmed in black and white.

Jesse LaVercombe reprised his role as Jack Walker in the two part season premiere.

Yannick Bisson directed the third and fourth episodes, episode three featured three famous literary characters. Rudyard Kipling, Lucy Maud Montgomery and Edith Wharton. William S. Harley and  Arthur Davidson appeared in episode five, when another inventor stole their ideas for motorcycles.  Brian Paul, Peter Keleghan, John Tench and Matthew Bennett reprised their roles as Prime Minister Laurier, Terrence Meyers, Alexander Graham Bell and Allen Clegg, respectively, with this being the final appearance for Bennet.  This season also marks the final appearance of James Graham as Arthur Carmichael.  Olympic gold medal winner, Andre De Grasse made his first TV appearance as a shop keeper, bragging how he fast he could run.  Peter Stebbings returns as James Pendrick and guest stars alongside Astronaut Chris Hadfield in episode fourteen, who is a Rocket Scientist, for the event of Halley's Comet.

Webisodes

The Curse of the Lost Pharaohs

The Murdoch Effect

Nightmare on Queen Street

The Infernal Device

Beyond Time

The Book of Jackson

Notes

References

External links 

 Official CBC website
 

Lists of Canadian drama television series episodes
Lists of mystery television series episodes